Oskar Wilkman (7 April 1880 – 28 June 1953) was a Finnish military officer, equestrian and modern pentathlete. He competed for Russia in the modern pentathlon at the 1912 Summer Olympics and for Finland in the equestrianism at the 1920 Summer Olympics. Wilkman fought in the 1918 Finnish Civil War on the White side. His brother was the general Karl Fredrik Wilkama.

References

1880 births
1953 deaths
Equestrians at the 1920 Summer Olympics
Finnish male equestrians
Russian male modern pentathletes
Olympic equestrians of Finland
Olympic modern pentathletes of Russia
Modern pentathletes at the 1912 Summer Olympics
Sportspeople from Helsinki
People of the Finnish Civil War (White side)